Karen Kaeja is a Canadian choreographer and dancer. She has been the co-artistic director of Kaeja d’Dance with her husband Allen Kaeja since 1990. In 2012, Kaeja conceived the community-based performance series Porch View Dances in Toronto's Seaton Village neighbourhood.

Among her stage works is Crave. According to The Toronto Star, she is "exploding barriers between art and life".

Kaeja has received multiple nominations for the Dora Mavor Moore Award.

References

External links
 Kaeja d'Dance

1961 births
Canadian choreographers
Canadian female dancers
Contemporary dance choreographers
People from Toronto
Living people
Canadian women choreographers